Antona tenuifascia is a moth of the subfamily Arctiinae first described by George Hampson in 1900. It is found in Brazil.

References

Lithosiini
Moths described in 1900
Moths of South America